"Suicides Love Story" is the tenth  single released by Nana Kitade . It was used as the ending theme for the anime Persona: Trinity Soul. The single reached #64 on the Oricon chart, remaining on the chart for two weeks.

Video
The video for "Suicides Love Story" shows Kitade singing throughout the video. At the end of the video she is supposedly to commit suicide, and is reincarnated as a cherry tree. According to Japanese legend,  the price to pay when a person commits suicide is reincarnation as a cherry tree where birds will peck at them for all eternity.

Track listing
Suicides Love Story 

Suicides Love Story: Instrumental

Charts

2008 singles
Nana Kitade songs
Songs written by Nana Kitade
2008 songs
Sony Music Entertainment Japan singles